Joseph Miller Langtry (1 May 1805 – 14 February 1862) was an officer of the Royal Navy. He rose to be a commander during his career, and was promoted to retired captain in 1859. Langtry was born at Aldingbourne, Sussex in 1805, the third son of Joseph Langtry. He entered the Royal Naval Academy, leaving it as a lieutenant on 22 October 1827. He joined  for service off Lisbon, and by 10 October 1829 had joined . He was lieutenant aboard  from 7 August 1835, and from 25 March 1836 until	October 1836, was lieutenant aboard .

Langtry was next lieutenant aboard , the flagship of Rear-Admiral John Ommanney from 2 October 1837, and then flag-lieutenant to Ommanney aboard  from 13 October 1840. From 23 September 1841 until December 1841 Langtry was lieutenant aboard . Langtry was promoted to the rank of captain, retired, on 11 December 1859. He died in Southampton, Hampshire on 14 February 1862.

Notes

External links
National Archives (UK) entry

1805 births
1862 deaths
Royal Navy officers
People from Aldingbourne